The 2019 ECAC Hockey Men's Ice Hockey Tournament is the 58th tournament in league history. It was played between March 8 and March 23, 2019. First Round and Quarterfinal games are played at home team campus sites, while the final four games are played at the Herb Brooks Arena in Lake Placid, New York. The tournament winner, Clarkson, received the ECAC's automatic bid to the 2019 NCAA Division I Men's Ice Hockey Tournament.

Format 
The tournament features four rounds of play. The teams that finish above fifth place in the standings receive a bye to the quarterfinal round. In the first round, the fifth and twelfth seeds, the sixth and eleventh seeds, the seventh and tenth seeds and the eighth and ninth seeds play a best-of-three series with the winners advancing to the quarterfinals. In the quarterfinals the one seed plays the lowest remaining seed, the second seed plays the second-lowest remaining seed, the third seed plays the third-lowest remaining seed and the fourth seed plays the fourth-lowest remaining seed in another best-of-three series with the winners of these the series advancing to the semifinals. In the semifinals the top remaining seed plays the lowest remaining seed while the two remaining teams play against each other. The winners of the semifinals play in the championship game, and no third-place game is played. All series after the quarterfinals are single-elimination games. The tournament champion receives an automatic bid to the 2019 NCAA Division I Men's Ice Hockey Tournament.

Standings

Bracket
Teams are reseeded for the Quarterfinals and Semifinals

Note: * denotes overtime period(s)

Results

First round

(5) Dartmouth vs. (12) St. Lawrence

(6) Yale vs. (11) Rensselaer

(7) Union vs. (10) Colgate

(8) Brown vs. (9) Princeton

Quarterfinals

(1) Quinnipiac vs. (8) Brown

(2) Cornell vs. (7) Union

(3) Clarkson vs. (6) Yale

(4) Harvard  vs. (5) Dartmouth

Semifinals

(2) Cornell vs. (8) Brown

(3) Clarkson vs. (4) Harvard

Championship

(2) Cornell vs. (3) Clarkson

Tournament awards

All-Tournament Team
F Noah Bauld (Cornell)
F Devin Brosseau* (Clarkson)
F Nico Sturm (Clarkson)
D Yanni Kaldis (Cornell)
D Matt Nuttle (Cornell)
G Jake Kielly (Clarkson)
* Most Outstanding Player(s)

References

ECAC Hockey Men's Ice Hockey Tournament
Sports in Lake Placid, New York
College sports in New York (state)
ECAC Tournament
Ice hockey in New York (state)
ECAC Hockey Men's Ice Hockey